The Engineer Research and Development Center (ERDC) is a US Army Corps of Engineers (USACE) research and laboratory organization. The headquarters is located in Vicksburg, Mississippi, on the site of an antecedent organization, the Waterways Experiment Station.

History
In October 1999, the Corps of Engineers established a system of laboratories, called the Engineer Research and Development Center (ERDC). The ERDC was a consolidation of seven, pre-existing laboratories: the Coastal and Hydraulics, Environmental, Geotechnical and Structures, and Information Technology Laboratories in Vicksburg, Mississippi; the Construction Engineering Research Laboratory in Champaign, Illinois; the Cold Regions Research and Engineering Laboratory in Hanover, New Hampshire; and the Topographic Engineering Center in Alexandria, Virginia, which became the Army Geospatial Center (AGC) and started reporting directly to the Corps of Engineers as of 2009. As of 2014, ERDC still maintained a Geospatial Research Laboratory (GRL) collocated in Alexandria with AGC.
 ERDC won the Army Research Laboratory of the Year award five times in its first eight years.

List of ERDC laboratories
 Geospatial Research Laboratory, co-located with the Army Geospatial Center at Alexandria, Virginia
 Coastal and Hydraulics Laboratory, Vicksburg, Mississippi
 Cold Regions Research and Engineering Laboratory, Hanover, New Hampshire
 Construction Engineering Research Laboratory, Champaign, Illinois
 Environmental Laboratory, Vicksburg, Mississippi
 Geotechnical and Structures Laboratory, Vicksburg, Mississippi
 Information Technology Laboratory, Vicksburg, Mississippi

References

External links
 ERDC Homepage
 ERDC library, with digitized copies of ERDC publications
 Discover ERDC USACE and DoD employees only
 US Army Corps of Engineers webpage
 ERDC DoD Supercomputing Resource Center (DSRC)
 

Mississippi River
United States Army Corps of Engineers
Organizations based in Mississippi
Vicksburg, Mississippi